Wissam Khodur, better known as Eslam Jawaad, is a rapper of Lebanese-Syrian origin. His debut album, The Mammoth Tusk, was released in 2009. The album was considered an international advancement for local Arabic hip-hop  as it featured support from a number of high-profile acts including Damon Albarn (Gorillaz/Blur), De La Soul, The Rza / Gza / Cilvaringz (Wu-Tang Clan), Focus... (Dr. Dre's Aftermath Entertainment), Rude Jude / Lord Sear (Shade 45), and 'Arap' band-mate Shadia Mansour.

Career

Jawaad's presence within the music industry is spread out across both the MENA region and Internationally.

In addition to his solo career, Jawaad is a founding member of the Arab Hip-Hop Collective known as 'Arap', which consisted of - in addition to himself- Mohalim, Cilvaringz, Ledr P, and Shadia Mansour.

The last members to officially join Arap were The Narcicyst, DJ Vanz and DJ Lady S, though they never recorded with the group. Associated acts included Malikah, DJ Lethal Skillz, RGB, L'Hamorabi, Rasta Pharaoh, and Miskeena.  Salah Edin, who founded the group with Eslam and Cilvaringz, left the group in 2009, and the group itself ceased to record soon after.  Though the band never released a studio album, the momentum they gave the Arab hip-hop movement through their tours and limited releases was one of the most anticipated and important developments for the genre.
  
Jawaad's first international tour was with Wu-Tang Killa Beez, as he was brought into that fold by his longtime associate, partner and manager Cilvaringz.  It was this that led to his collaboration with Rza and Gza on his album song 'So Real' ft. Shadia Mansour. His most recent endeavor with Wu-Tang is his Co-Executive Producer credits on the single-copy, art piece - Wu-Tang Clan album "Once Upon A Time in Shaolin", which made it into the Guinness Book of Records, as most valuable album. In addition to this, Jawaad also featured on Cilvaringz Album, "I".

He has also toured with a number of other notable acts including Gorillaz, The Good The Bad and The Queen, Fun-da-mental, and Africa Express. He is an avid supporter of MENA region music and uses his influence to promote various artists from the region, while also managing acts including Mais Harb and Layali Project which he successfully signed onto Universal Music.

Jawaad was instrumental in bringing long time friend and musical collaborator Damon Albarn to Syria to record with the Syrian National Orchestra for Arabic Music, and recordings from these sessions made it onto the Gorillaz album 'Plastic Beach', with the Orchestra alongside Albarn and Jawaad eventually touring under the Africa Express banner in 2016 across major festivals including Glastonbury and Roskilde.

Jawaad also played an integral role in promoting Arab artists internationally

Personal life

Jawaad is father of three children and currently resides in the Dubai. After working as Executive Director for Global Gumbo Group, an LA and Dubai based company founded by Quincy Jones, he is currently Spotifys' Head of Artist & Label Marketing across the Middle East and North Africa. He continues to consult within the industry, and has lectured at Cambridge University's Judge Business School.

Discography

 Eslam Jawaad - The Mammoth Tusk (2009)
 The Good, the Bad & the Queen - Mr. Whippy (2007)
 Cilvaringz - I (2007)
 Gorillaz - Plastic Beach (2010)
 Gorillaz - Clint Eastwood (Eslam Jawaad Version- Live) (2010)
 Fun-Da-Mental - All is War (The Benefits of G-Had) (2006)
 Visionary Underground - Keep The Grime On (2005)
 Souterrain Productions - 50 MC's Vol. 2 (2005)
 7th Century Records - Palestine The Album (2009)
 Darwish - 7th Sky (2004)
 Darwish - Today's Democracy (2006)
 Salah Edin - HORR (2009)
 Salah Edin - The Official Mix Tape (2006)
 Peace is my religion, music is my weapon - Mixtape (2011)
 Peace is my religion, music is my weapon - Palestine Vol. 2 (2012)
 Lowkey - Long Live Palestine 2 (2009)
 Nickodemus - A Dubai Minute (2012)
 Le Jakal - Alchemistas (2008)
 UK Apache - Concrete Jungle (2009)
 Fun-Da-Mental - A Philosophy of Nothing (2015)
 Gorillaz - White Flag - Live version taken from Africa Express Presents: The Orchestra of Syrian Musicians & Guests (2016)

His song "Pivot Widdit" was used in the Dubai film City of Life, and "Siasa" in Hollywood blockbuster Rendition.

References

External links
http://www.thenational.ae/arts-culture/music/creating-music-fit-for-museums
 http://www.dubainight.com/dubai/casa-latina/thursday-march-20-boombox-presents-mohalim-arap-supported-by-shadia-mansour-eslam-jawaad,1,767820.html
 https://www.npr.org/2010/07/29/128846005/gorillaz-recorded-live-in-damascus

Lebanese rappers
Living people
Year of birth missing (living people)